Eveline Brunner (born 27 January 1996) is a Swiss former competitive figure skater. In the 2014–15 season, she won bronze at the Merano Cup and gold at the Swiss Championships. She was subsequently named in the Swiss team to the 2015 European Championships in Stockholm. Brunner reached the free skate and finished 14th overall in Sweden. She placed 33rd at the 2015 World Championships in Shanghai, China. On April 9, 2015, she retired from competition.

Programs

Competitive highlights 
JGP: Junior Grand Prix

References

External links 
 

1996 births
Swiss female single skaters
Living people
Figure skaters from Zürich
Sportspeople from Pittsburgh
American emigrants to Switzerland
American sportswomen
American expatriate sportspeople in Switzerland